Cui Qi (born 26 October 1997) is a Chinese footballer currently playing as a full-back for Changchun Yatai. He is the twin brother of fellow footballer Cui Lin.

Club career
Cui Qi along with his younger twin brother would play for the Changchun Yatai youth team before going on to training camps in Portugal before joining Campeonato de Portugal side Tourizense. He would immediately be promoted to the senior team and go on to make his debut on 21 August 2016 in a league game against Mortágua in a 1-1 draw. After a personally successful spell with the club where he established himself as regular within the team he would move to second tier club Cova da Piedade and then Loures before returning back Changchun Yatai.

On 12 September 2020 he would make his debut in the first league game for the club of the season that ended in a 2-1 victory against Heilongjiang Lava Spring. He would go on to establish himself as a vital member of the team and at the end of the 2020 league campaign he would go on to win the division title with the club.

Career statistics
.

Honours

Club
Changchun Yatai
 China League One: 2020

References

External links

1997 births
Living people
Chinese footballers
Chinese expatriate footballers
Association football defenders
Campeonato de Portugal (league) players
China League One players
Chinese Super League players
Changchun Yatai F.C. players
G.D. Tourizense players
C.D. Cova da Piedade players
Chinese expatriate sportspeople in Portugal
Expatriate footballers in Portugal